Turquzabad (also Romanized as Ţūrqūzābād) is a village in Kahrizak Rural District, Kahrizak District, Ray County, Tehran Province, Iran. At the 2006 census, its population was 2,803, in 669 families.

Atomic warehouse
On September 27, 2018, Israeli Prime Minister Netanyahu showed the UN General Assembly a photo of an alleged nuclear storage facility in Turquzabad.

On 8 September 2019, nearly a year after Benjamin Netanyahu's claim about the secret nuclear storage in Turquzabad, Reuters reported quoting two diplomats close to the International Atomic Energy Agency as saying that uranium samples were found at the site.

References 

Populated places in Ray County, Iran